Strathaven (from  ) is a historic market town in South Lanarkshire, Scotland and is the largest settlement in Avondale. The Powmillon Burn runs through the town centre, and joins the Avon Water to the east of the town.

The current estimated population is 8,000. The town was granted a royal charter in 1450, making the Town of Strathaven a burgh of barony. The A71, which connects Edinburgh and Irvine, passes through the town.

History

A Roman road passes close by, on the south side of the Avon Water; it led to the Roman fort at Loudoun Hill near Darvel. The origins of Strathaven Castle are obscure, but it is believed to have been held by the Bairds until after the end of the Wars of Scottish Independence in 1357. It then passed to William Douglas, 1st Earl of Douglas in 1370.

The settlement within the lands of Strathaven became a burgh of barony in 1450. The centre of the town is occupied by the market square, formerly a grassed common, and still known as Common Green, or just 'The Green'. Linking the town and the castle is the old 'Boo Backit Brig' ('bow-backed bridge'), a small arched bridge.

The Old Parish Church, with its landmark spire, was built in 1772, and was the place of worship of the Dukes of Hamilton, who had a section of the church reserved for them.

The town played a significant part in the Radical War of 1820, when James Wilson led a band of radicals on a march to Glasgow, to join a rumoured general uprising, which never actually happened. Wilson was hanged for treason.

Its most famous 'modern' resident was the singer, Sir Harry Lauder (1870–1950) whose mansion, Lauder Ha', or Hall, was just above the town on the road to Kilmarnock. Sir Harry spent the Second World War years there, and died in February 1950.

Dungavel House on the outskirts of Strathaven was the place where German Deputy Führer, Rudolf Hess, originally intended to land on the evening of 10 May 1941 in a misguided attempt to seek peace talks with the Duke of Hamilton. However bad weather and poor navigation resulted in Hess having to land at Floors Farm in Eaglesham.

In 2002, Strathaven was granted the title of Scotland's First Fairtrade Town (jointly with Aberfeldy) under the leadership of Paulo Quadros, chair of the first Fairtrade group in Scotland.

Governance
The town is part of the Avondale and Stonehouse ward of the South Lanarkshire council area. Before 1996, it was part of the Strathclyde region, with a district council in East Kilbride. Previous to that, it had been part of the Fourth landward district of the County of Lanark.

As part of Scottish devolution, national governmental power is split between the UK Parliament and Government and the Scottish Parliament and Government. As of 2021, it is in the East Kilbride, Strathaven and Lesmahagow constituency of the UK Parliament (MP [2019]: Lisa Cameron [SNP]) and the Clydesdale constituency of the Scottish Parliament (MSP [2021]: Màiri McAllan [SNP]).

Long-established business
The town's longest established business is Gebbie & Wilson, Solicitors in the Common Green, which was founded in 1816.

Landmarks 
The major landmark in the town is Strathaven Castle. Strathaven Public Hall was designed by Alexander Cullen and completed in 1896.

Transport 
The A71, which connects Edinburgh and Irvine passes through the town. The A723 links Strathaven to Hamilton and the A726 links it to East Kilbride, and further onto Glasgow. As part of South Lanarkshire, the town is in the Strathclyde Partnership for Transport area.

Former railway stations 

Strathaven had, at various times, three railway stations.
 , the first station, was the terminus of the Hamilton and Strathaven Railway. The railway was taken over by the Caledonian Railway; and the station closed in 1964.
 , a terminal station on the Hamilton and Strathaven Branch of the Caledonian Railway, opened in October 1904, closed temporarily during World War I; and closed completely in 1953.
 , on the Darvel and Strathaven Railway closed in June 1964 to services from the east, although the line to Darvel closed in 1939.

Strathaven Airfield 

Strathaven Airfield is home to a microlight flying school, which operates both the traditional-style weightshift microlights and the light aircraft-style ones, and the new airfield manager's house was featured on Channel 4's Grand Designs in October 2013. There are approximately 35 aircraft – both light aircraft and microlights – hangared at Strathaven in two modern purpose-built hangars. The airfield is also home to an annual local music festival, HangarFest. The airfield was set up on the old Couplaw Farm, which The Scottish Flying Club Ltd bought in May 1964. The club had begun flying in 1927 at the old Renfrew Airport but was left homeless after Renfrew was nationalised in 1946. Strathaven Airfield was given to the RAF Benevolent Fund in 1974 and then sold privately in 2005. It has three grass runways, the main runway is oriented 09/27 (east-west) and is 530 m long (with a 100 m starter extension on 27 available on request). The airfield co-ordinates in the UK Air Pilot ENR 5.5-17 are: 554049N 0040654W.

Education 
There are 7 primary schools in and around Strathaven,  Chapelton Primary School, Gilmourton Primary School, Kirklandpark Primary School, Sandford Primary School, St Patrick's Primary School and Wester Overton Primary School

Strathaven Academy is the town's only secondary school.

Religion 

Strathaven contains six churches including three Church of Scotland parishes: Avendale Old (built in 1772) linked with Drumclog Parish Church, Strathaven Rankin linked with Chapelton Parish Church, and East Parish Church (built in 1777) linked with Glassford Parish Church.

The only Catholic Church in the town is St Patrick's Catholic Church (built in 1863).

There is an active ecumenical body, consisting of six churches in the area (five within the town, one nearby), named "Hope Strathaven", which work together bringing a mix of community projects that reflect faith and service.

Sport
Strathaven is home to several sports clubs, which include Strathaven Rugby Club which has a 3G, all-weather pitch.

Culture
Strathaven Hotel houses a small seated venue holding acoustic music gigs under the title FRETS. Artists performing have included Arab Strap, Norman Blake and Euros Childs, Lloyd Cole, Altered Images, Robyn Hitchcock and Michael Head.

Notable people
Bertie Auld, footballer and one of the Lisbon Lions who played with Celtic, lived in Strathaven
Stuart Braithwaite, singer and musician with the band Mogwai, attended Strathaven Academy
Eric Caldow, Scottish international footballer who played with Rangers, founder of Strathaven Dynamo
William Craig, surgeon and botanist, President of the Edinburgh Botanical Society and Fellow of the Royal Society of Edinburgh, born in Strathaven
Jack Smart, football Player
Linda Fabiani, Scottish National Party politician and former Scottish Executive Minister for Europe, External Affairs and Culture, lived in Strathaven
David Fernández, Spanish footballer who spent most of his career in Scotland playing for clubs including Celtic and Kilmarnock, lived in Strathaven 
Daniel Thomson, footballer 
James Mackinnon Fowler, Australian politician and founding member of the Victorian Socialist League, born in Strathaven 
Gordon Gibb, businessman, CEO of Flamingo Land Ltd and former chairman of Bradford City Football Club, brought up in Strathaven 
Sir Robert Giffen, financial editor of The Times newspaper and President of the Royal Statistical Society, born in Strathaven
Andy Kerr, Labour politician and former Scottish Executive Health Minister, lives in Strathaven. 
Sir Harry Lauder, singer, comedian and music hall entertainer
Thomas Leiper, tobacco merchant 
Stuart McCall, Scottish international footballer who played for Rangers, Everton and Bradford City, lived in Strathaven
Una McLean, actress and comedian
Aileen Neilson, Paralympian, lives in Strathaven
Corrie Scott, swimmer and bronze medalist at the 2014 Commonwealth Games
 Andy Stewart, Conservative MP from 1983–1992 for Sherwood, chaired Strathaven Young Unionists in 1957–58.
Sara Vickers, actor, born in Strathaven 
Ricky Warwick, singer and guitarist with rock bands The Almighty and Circus Diablo, currently vocalist with Thin Lizzy
James Wilson, revolutionary leader who participated in the Scottish Insurrection of 1820

Notes

References

External links
Town of Strathaven
Strathaven in Old Postcards
Scottish Gazetteer: Strathaven

 
Towns in South Lanarkshire